A book town is a town or village with many used book or antiquarian bookstores. These stores, as well as literary festivals, attract bibliophile tourists. Some book towns are members of the International Organisation of Book Towns.

List of book towns

Book towns with known dates of operation
 Kaifeng, China (17th century)
 Jinbōchō, Japan (early 1880s)
 Hay-on-Wye, Wales (1961)
 Redu, Belgium (1984)
 Bécherel, France (1988)
 Montolieu, France (1989)
 Bredevoort, Netherlands (1993)
 Saint-Pierre-de-Clages, Switzerland (1993)
 Fontenoy-la-Joûte, France (1993)
 Mundal, Norway (1995)
 Wigtown, Scotland (1997)
 Zossen-Wünsdorf, Germany (1997)
 Damme, Belgium (1997)
 Dalmellington, Scotland (1997, though the last bookseller closed in 2005 and the project has folded.)
 Sysmä, Finland (4 July 1997)
 Mühlbeck-Friedersdorf, Germany (1997)
 Kampung Buku Langkawi, Malaysia (3 December 1997)
 Archer City, U.S. (1999)
 Montmorillon, France (2000)
 Southern Highlands, Australia (2000)
 Mellösa, Sweden (2001)
 Tvedestrand, Norway (2003)
 Sedbergh, England (2003)
 Blaenavon, Wales (28 June 2003, though the project had folded by March 2006.)
 Brownville, U.S. (2004)
 Hobart, U.S. – Book Village of the Catskills (2005)
 Atherstone, England (2005)
 Torup, Denmark (2006) 
 Richmond, South Africa (2006)
 Kampung Buku Melaka, Malaysia  (17 April 2007)
 Urueña, Spain (2007) 
 Bellprat, Spain (2008)
 Esquelbecq, France (2010) 
 Borrby, Sweden (17 July 2011)
 Clunes, Australia (2012)
 Montereggio, Mulazzo, Italy
 Óbidos, Portugal (2015)
 Featherston, New Zealand (2015)
 Cervera, Spain (2016)
 Montblanc, Spain (2017)
 Bhilar, India (2017)
 La Pobla de Segur, Spain (2018)
 L'Escala, Spain (2019)

Book towns with unknown dates of operation

 Sidney, Canada
 Gold Cities BookTown, Grass Valley, U.S.

See also
 UNESCO World Book Capital (est. 2001)

References

External links
 International Organisation of Book Towns
 Catalonia Organisation of Book Towns

Literary festivals
 
Bookstores
Bookselling
Types of towns